The Oeschinenhorn is a mountain of the Bernese Alps, overlooking Lake Oeschinen in the Bernese Oberland. It lies just west of the Blüemlisalp.

References

External links
Oechinenhorn on Hikr

Mountains of the Alps
Alpine three-thousanders
Mountains of Switzerland
Mountains of the canton of Bern